Hampstead was a borough constituency, centered on the Hampstead area of North London. It returned one Member of Parliament (MP)  to the House of Commons of the Parliament of the United Kingdom, who was elected using the first-past-the-post voting system.

It was created for the 1885 general election, and abolished for the 1983 general election, when it was partly replaced by the new Hampstead and Highgate constituency.

Boundaries 
1885–1918: The parish of St John, Hampstead.

The parliamentary borough of Hampstead was created by the Redistribution of Seats Act 1885, and consisted of the civil parish of St John, Hampstead, Middlesex. The parish had previously formed part of the Parliamentary County of Middlesex. Hampstead lay within the area of the Metropolitan Board of Works, and in 1889 this became the County of London. In 1900 the county was divided into twenty-eight metropolitan boroughs, with the civil parish becoming the Metropolitan Borough of Hampstead.

Parliamentary constituencies were redrawn under the Representation of the People Act 1918, with boundaries in London realigned to those of the metropolitan boroughs. Accordingly, the Hampstead constituency was defined by the legislation as being identical in area to the metropolitan borough of the same name. When the next redistribution was carried out under the Representation of the People Act 1948, the term "parliamentary borough" was replaced with "borough constituency". The renamed Hampstead Borough Constituency continued with the same boundaries, with the changes coming into effect for the 1950 general election.

In 1965 both the County of London and the metropolitan boroughs were abolished. Hampstead became part of the larger London Borough of Camden. The changes were not reflected in parliamentary boundaries until 1970. The constituency was officially renamed "Camden, Hampstead Borough Constituency" and was defined as comprising seven wards of the London Borough, namely Adelaide, Belsize, Hampstead Town, Kilburn, Priory, Swiss Cottage and West End. The wards of the borough were altered in 1973, with Swiss Cottage ward replacing Hampstead Central in the constituency's definition. These boundaries were used until 1983, when the seat was abolished.

Members of Parliament

Election results

Elections in the 1880s

Holland was appointed Vice-President of the Committee of the Council on Education, requiring a by-election.

Holland was elevated to the peerage, becoming Lord Knutsford, causing a by-election.

Elections in the 1890s

Elections in the 1900s

Election in the 1910s

Elections in the 1920s

Elections in the 1930s

Elections in the 1940s

Elections in the 1950s

Elections in the 1960s

Elections in the 1970s

References 

 British Parliamentary Election Results 1885-1918, compiled and edited by F.W.S. Craig (Macmillan Press 1974)
 Debrett’s Illustrated Heraldic and Biographical House of Commons and the Judicial Bench 1886
 Debrett’s House of Commons and the Judicial Bench 1901
 Debrett’s House of Commons and the Judicial Bench 1918

Parliamentary constituencies in London (historic)
Constituencies of the Parliament of the United Kingdom established in 1885
Constituencies of the Parliament of the United Kingdom disestablished in 1983
Hampstead
Politics of the London Borough of Camden